The Optogan group of companies is a vertically integrated producer of High Brightness LEDs based in St. Petersburg, Russian Federation. The group is also active in Finland and Germany.  Founded in 2004 by 3 graduates of the Ioffe Physical-Technical Institute, it is currently owned by various private and government investment funds.

History

Optogan was founded in 2004 in Espoo, Finland by Dr. Maxim Odnoblyudov, Dr. Vladislav Bougrov and Dr. Alexey Kovsh, all graduates of the chair of Nobel Prize laureate Zhores Alferov. It has received several rounds of financing from various European VC investment funds. After the initial technology development stage the company R&D and pilot production line were expanded to MST Factory site in Dortmund, Germany. After 5 years of technology development stage in 2008 the company was acquired by a strategic investor – Russian private equity group Onexim. In 2009 Russian government investment funds Rusnano and RIK have joined Onexim group as investors to develop a full-scale production facility for HB LEDs in Strelna Free-Economic zone near St. Petersburg, Russian Federation.

Activities

Optogan is investing in further R&D of GaN technology and building an LED manufacturing facility capable of producing 1.5 billion HB LEDs/month near St. Petersburg in Russia.

Technology
Optogan company possesses the whole value chain of technologies in solid state lighting (SSL) necessary for the production of GaN based light emitting diodes (LEDs)  and consumer-oriented SSL luminaries. The chain of technologies include 
 Epitaxial growth of high-quality semiconductor (GaN) wafers by metal-organic chemical vapor deposition  (MOCVD)  technique; 
 LED chip design and fabrication; 
 LED packaging including phosphor  coating for the conversion of the blue and ultraviolet  radiation in visible white light spectrum, and lens molding; 
 Multichip LED mounting on printed circuit board with final assembling of various types of luminaries.    
Massive breakthrough in GaN based LED technology started form pioneering works by S. Nakamura in early nineties of last century. OptoGaN technologies are characterized by improved quality of GaN wafers and patented LED epilayer structure with enhanced light generation capability, original f-PowerTM chip design enabling uniform electric current distribution in excess of 300 A/cm2, effectiveness of  LEDs as high as 110 lm/W which is at the front level of World leading LED manufactures. OptoGaN intellectual property (IP) and technologies are covered by 35 granted and pending patents.

References

External links
Optogan official website 
Optogan official website 

Companies based in Saint Petersburg
Technology companies established in 2004
Russian brands
Lighting brands
Nanotechnology companies
Nanotechnology companies of Russia